The deadCENTER Film Festival was founded in 2001 in Oklahoma City. The festival was named "deadCENTER" because it is located in the exact center of the United States.  Although presenting over a hundred films, and an international assemblage of filmmakers, deadCENTER has remained focused on being open to independent local filmmakers.

The festival runs for five days every year in June and has attracted notable actors including Spike Jonze and Rinko Kikuchi. The deadCENTER was named one of the 20 Coolest Film Festivals of 2010 by MovieMaker Magazine.

Founding
In the spring of 2000, filmmakers and brothers Jayson Floyd and Justan Floyd travelled to Muskogee, Oklahoma, for the inaugural Bare Bones Film Festival. Sharon Ray, a film producer, educator, and entrepreneur who had grown up splitting time between Muskogee and Los Angeles, launched the festival so that she and her husband could meet other filmmakers, share best practices, and increase their knowledge of the film industry.
The Floyd brothers loved the festival. But they believed it could better serve the Oklahoma film community if it were based in Oklahoma City. So, the following June, they launched their own festival at the Oklahoma Contemporary space at the State Fair grounds. They called it deadCenter for its location in the deadCenter of the country and the deadCenter of the calendar year.
That first year, most of the films were short films made in Oklahoma. The Floyd’s mother cooked hotdogs and set up concessions. But, the community of filmmakers that was created that first year established a solid foundation for the thriving, statewide film industry that exists today.

References

External links
 

Film festivals in Oklahoma
Tourist attractions in Oklahoma City